The Ascension is the sixth studio album by Nigerian singer 2face Idibia. It was released on July 21, 2014, by Hypertek Digital and 960 Music Group. The album is the follow-up to his fifth studio album, Away and Beyond (2012). It features guest appearances from Machel Montano, Vector, Bridget Kelly, Rocksteady, Dammy Krane, Sir Victor Uwaifo, Iceberg Slim, Kim Almarcha, Shurwayne Winchester and Fally Ipupa. 2face enlisted Leriq, Alton Berti, Bolji Beats, Dezay, Dnyce, Fabio Litto, Femdouble, GSol the Producer, Jay Sleek, Kodjo, Masterkraft and Rolly to produce the album. The Ascension debuted at number 12 on the Billboard World Albums chart and received generally mixed reviews from music critics. By having an album debut on the aforementioned chart, 2face became the first Nigerian artist to achieve this feat. The album produced three singles, two of which were released in the months leading up to the album's release. To promote the album, 960 Music Group placed outdoor billboards across 10 densely populated areas of Lagos.

Background and launch
2face began recording the album in 2013. In a press release, 960 Music Group said the album would be released on July 21, 2014. The Ascension was eventually released in two versions: economy and premium. The premium version includes a 16-page insert and is available exclusively at Konga.com, while the economy (or digital) version is available for digital download on Spinlet, iTunes and Spotify. The album's cover art was conceptualized and designed by Janne Kukka and Mole "Tobbie" Balogun.

On July 9, 2014, 2face released a 30-second clip of all the songs on the album. On July 19, he held the album's launch party at Escape in Victoria Island, Lagos. Guests in attendance included Olamide, Tiwa Savage, Niyola, Sasha P, Fade Ogunro, BOJ, Dammy Krane, Tola Odunsi, Ono Bello, Ehiz, Pucado, Jermaine Jackson, Peter Okoye, Onos O and Ruby. MTV Base, in conjunction with Industry Nite, hosted another launch party on July 23, 2014.

Composition
The album's music is predominantly R&B and Afropop, but incorporates elements of soca, zouk and highlife. The Ascension consists of songs whose tempo is naturally fast or slow. 2face dedicated the electro house record "#Aproko" to social media critics. In "Jeje", he samples African China's "Mr. President" and pays homage to afrobeat of the 70s. The songs "International Loving" and "Diaspora Woman" have elements of zouk. Soca's rhythms are evident on "Boulay Boulay" and "Go". The slow tempo ballad "Hate What You Do To Me" has a sensitive theme. "Kiss of Life" is also a slow tempo ballad with soft lyrics.

Singles
The Masterkraft-produced track "Ife Dinma" was released on November 6, 2013, as the album's lead single. It was initially released as a Tony Oneweek single, but surprisingly made the album. The accompanying music video for "Ife Dinma" was directed by Clarence Peters.

The album's second single "Let Somebody Love You" was released on May 26, 2014. The song was produced by Femi Femdouble and features vocals by Bridget Kelly. Its music video was shot and directed in Lagos by Luke Biggins. In April 2014, 2face and Bridget Kelly performed the song during Star Music Trek's visit to Markudi.

The album's third single "Go" was released on June 26, 2014. It features guest vocals by Trinidadian soca singer Machel Montano. In June 2014, both artists performed the song at the 18th annual St. Kitts Music Festival. The music video for "Go" was released by 960 Music on December 5, 2014, and features cameo appearances from Seyi Shay and Niyola.

The album's fourth single "Diaspora Woman" was released on October 23, 2014. Its music video was filmed in Dallas by Moe Musa. Ghanaian actress Juliet Ibrahim played 2face's love interest in the video.

Critical reception

The Ascension received generally mixed reviews from music critics. Chiagoziem Onyekwena of Nigeria Entertainment Today awarded the album 3 stars out 5, stating, "I know 2face set out to make a forward or upward moving album on The Ascension but what he really has done is move sideways, at best. That isn't bad in itself, just not the genre-bending, boundary-crossing, revolutionary album it had the potential to be." Brandon Bridges of Lobatan commended the album's songwriting, diverse sounds, instrumentation, and energetic appeal.

Track listing

Sampling credits
"Jeje" samples African China's "Mr. President"

Personnel
Credits adapted from liner notes of The Ascension.

Innocent Idibia – primary artist, writer, performer
Efe Omorogbe – A&R, executive producer
Eric Idiahi – executive producer
Mark Redguard – co-executive producer
Machel Montano – featured artist, writer
Olanrewaju Ogunmefun – featured artist, writer
Bridget Kelly – featured artist, writer
Rocksteady – featured artist, writer
Oyindamola Emmanuel – featured artist, writer
Sir Victor Uwaifo – featured artist, writer
Iceberg Slim – featured artist, writer
Kim Almarcha – featured artist, writer
Shurwayne Winchester – featured artist, writer
Fally Ipupa – featured artist, writer
Femi "Femidouble" Ojetunde – producer, engineer
Olubunmi "GSol the Producer" Afolabi – producer, engineer
Precision Productions and Advokit Productions – producer, engineer 
Leriq – producer, engineer
Jay Sleek – producer
Masterkraft – producer
Rolly – producer
Bolaji "Bolji Beats" Salabiu – producer, engineer
Dnyce – producer, engineer
Alton Berti – producer, engineer
Fabio Lancel – producer
Franck "Kodjo" Kpanku – producer
Michael "Dezay" Badibanji – producer
Fooster Zeno – engineer
Willie "O" Oputa Chukwuemeka – engineer, production coordination
Jeremie Tuil – engineer
Pieter Wagner – engineer
Janne Kukka – cover art
TCD Photography – photography
Rhiemen Phenom Omorogbe – production coordination
Francis J Ogbole – production coordination
Bayo Omisore – production coordination
960 Music Group – PR Support
Buzz Warehaus – PR Support
Felicia Alston – PR Support
Now Muzik Entertainment – management
Obaino Music – distribution
YSG Hubs – distribution
Konga.com – distribution
Spinlet – distribution

Charts

Release history

References

2014 albums
Albums produced by Masterkraft (producer)
2face Idibia albums
Albums produced by Leriq
Albums produced by Jay Sleek
2014 in Nigerian music